Ghulam Yahya Daneshian (born 1906 in Sarab, East Azerbaijan — death 2006 in Baku) was an Iranian Azerbaijani politician and military. He was a general in the Azerbaijan's Government Army and Commander of National Army. Also Ghulam Yahya was Deputy Minister of War Ja'far Kavian in the Pishevari cabinet.

References
 *
 BBC.com

1983 deaths
1906 births
Burials at Alley of Honor
People from Sarab, East Azerbaijan
Iranian military commanders
Iranian generals
Azerbaijani Democratic Party politicians
Azerbaijani people of Iranian descent
Iranian emigrants to the Soviet Union
People granted political asylum in the Soviet Union
Central Committee of the Tudeh Party of Iran members